Greta Elisa Hofer (born 8 January 2000) is an Austrian fashion model.

Career 
Hofer was spotted by a scout while out in Innsbruck, as well as via Instagram. After securing an agent, she made her runway debut as a Prada exclusive in 2020 and starred in their S/S 2021 campaign. Despite the COVID-19 pandemic stalling the fashion industry at that time, her career took off that year. She is known for her short haircut, which she has kept since she was 17 years old. In May 2021, she appeared on the cover of Vogue Italia for an astrology-themed issue, with other models such as Anna Ewers, Jill Kortleve, and Rebecca Leigh Longendyke on alternate covers, all of them wearing the same Chanel outfit. In September 2022, she participated in the Vogue World event, walking the runway dressed as Cruella de Vil with many other top models and influencers as well as celebrities including Serena Williams. She has appeared in W, The Wall Street Journal, Vogue France, and Vogue Japan.

Vogue picked her as one of the "10 Breakout models" of the spring 2022 season. Hofer has walked the runway for designers Isabel Marant, Valentino, Dior, Alberta Ferretti, Jil Sander and Chloé among others. Outside of Prada, she has appeared in ensemble campaigns for Dior (pre-fall), and Salvatore Ferragamo alongside actor Jharrel Jerome and other models.

Personal life 
Hofer is the youngest of three, having two sisters, and they were raised in the Austrian Alps town of Steinach am Brenner. At age 17, she cut her previously long hair overnight. She learns languages in her spare time including Russian and French. She lives in Vienna with her partner, and says she wants to help "normalise homosexual relationships".

Notes

References 

2000 births
Living people
Austrian female models
The Society Management models
Elite Model Management models
Prada exclusive models
People from Tyrol (state)
People from Innsbruck
21st-century Austrian women